Tethystola mutica is a species of beetle in the family Cerambycidae. It was described by Gaha in 1895. It is known from Grenada, St. Vincent, and Trinidad and Tobago.

References

Apomecynini
Beetles described in 1895
Beetles of South America